Antonius Bernardus Matthijs Frinking (1 February 1931 – 3 August 2022) was a Dutch politician. He served in the Royal Netherlands Army as a major from 1969 to 1975 and as lieutenant colonel from 1975 to 1977. He served as a member of the House of Representatives from 1977 to 1993. Frinking died in August 2022 in Delft, at the age of 91.

References 

1931 births
2022 deaths
Members of the House of Representatives (Netherlands)
20th-century Dutch politicians
Christian Democratic Appeal politicians
Catholic People's Party politicians
Politicians from Groningen (city)